Mary McElroy may refer to:

 Mary Arthur McElroy (1841–1917), sister of the 21st President of the United States, Chester A. Arthur
 Mary McElroy (kidnapping victim) (c. 1907–1940), American kidnapping victim
 Mary S. McElroy (born 1965), U.S. federal judge from Rhode Island